Tamilisai Soundararajan (born 2 June 1961) is an Indian politician serving as the 2nd and current Governor of Telangana, and is the Lieutenant Governor of Puducherry (Additional charge) since 18 February 2021. She was the National Secretary and Tamil Nadu State Unit President of the BJP prior to this appointment.

Personal life and education
She was born in Kaliyakkavilai, Kanyakumari, Tamil Nadu on 2 June 1961. Her father Kumari Ananthan, is a former Member of Parliament and senior congress party leader in Tamil Nadu. Her husband, Mr. Soundarajan, is a medical doctor. Her paternal cousin is actor and businessman turned politician Vijay Vasanth.

She did graduation from Ethiraj College for Women, followed by pursuing her MBBS at Madras Medical College, Chennai and her obstetrics and gynaecology qualifications at Dr. MGR Medical University, Chennai. She did higher training in sonology and FET therapy in Canada.

Prior to political commitment she worked as an assistant professor at Ramachandra Medical College, Chennai for 5 years. She has two children, a boy and a girl, both are doctors.

As recognition of her dedicated service to the society and general public and promoting gender equality women empowerment, she was awarded “ International Rising Star of the Year – 2018” by multi ethnic advisory task force, USA operating under US Congressman Danny K. Davis.

Political career

Soundararajan became interested in politics from childhood, having been brought up in a political family.
She was elected as a student leader during her studies at Madras Medical College.  She served the Tamil Nadu state BJP unit in various capacities starting from South Chennai District Medical Wing Secretary in 1999, State General Secretary Medical Wing in 2001, All India Co-Convenor (Medical Wing For Southern States) in 2005, State General Secretary in 2007, State Vice-President in 2010 and elevated as National Secretary, All India BJP in 2013.

She was appointed the Governor of Telangana on 1 September 2019 by the order of the President of India, Ram Nath Kovind and currently is also 1st woman to hold the office of the state. She took charge as Governor of Telangana on 9 September 2019. She was given additional charge of Puducherry (union territory) on 16 February 2021 and is fifth woman to hold the office of the Union Territory. During the Covid-19 pandemic she visited healthcare workers in hospitals and encouraged vaccination.

Soundararajan has lost in all her attempts at becoming an MP or MLA to date, having contested two Assembly elections and Parliament elections unsuccessfully. In the 2019 Indian general election, she lost against Kanimozhi Karunanidhi, daughter of former chief minister of Tamil Nadu M. Karunanidhi from Thoothukkudi. She extensively campaigned in parliament and assembly elections across the state.

Media
She conducted a programme promoting the oratory skills for students and children, which was broadcast on the Tamil channel Raj TV for more than 10 years. She conducted a weekly programme for women in "Doordarshan" Channel which was aired as Magalir Panchayat (Women's Court) for over 5 years. She participated in several political debates against other political leaders including Sun TV, NDTV, Times Now and various local channels.

Elections contested

Lok Sabha Elections

Electoral performance

Positions

Women's rights
Soundararajan is a supporter of the #metoo movement and has emphasized that any woman who had faced sexual harassment should get justice.

Temple management
Soundararajan has asserted that temples must be managed by committees formed of devotees of the temple and consist of theists.

Telangana Governor 
Dr. Tamilisai Soundararajan was sworn in as the first woman Governor of Telangana in the year 2019, replacing the post held by E.S.L. Narasimhan. She's the second governor of the State of Telangana, which was formed on June 2, 2014. She's the youngest among all state governors. To explore the resources among alumni, an online portal

called 'Chancellor Connect' was created.

As a Governor 
Raj Bhavan under Dr. Tamilisai Soundararajan, in association with Telangana State Council of Higher Education (TSCHE), instituted 'Chancellor's Awards' for best teachers, best research, and best university in academic social responsibility.

Dr. Tamilisai organized meetings in association with the National Institute of Nutrition (NIN), Hyderabad, to create a detailed action plan for formulating an appropriate nutrition intervention program for Telangana's tribal communities.

Lt. Governor of Puducherry 
Dr. Tamilisai Soundararajan was sworn in as Lt. Governor of Puducherry (additional charge ) on 18 February 2021.  Chief Justice of Madras High court Justice Sanjeeb Banerjee administered the oath of office and secrecy to her. Tamilisai took the oath in Tamil.

References 

1961 births
20th-century Indian medical doctors
21st-century Indian medical doctors
21st-century Indian politicians
21st-century Indian women politicians
Bharatiya Janata Party politicians from Tamil Nadu
Governors of Telangana
Indian women medical doctors
Lieutenant Governors of Puducherry
Living people
People from Kanyakumari district